Rupert Jack Svendsen-Cook (born 17 September 1990 in Ipswich) is a British racing driver with Norwegian family history.

Career
Following eight years in karting, Rupert's first step into car racing was the Formula BMW Europe series in 2008 with Räikkönen Robertson Racing and then again in 2009. He then graduated to the British Formula 3 International Series with Carlin for 2 more seasons in 2010 and 2011.

British Formula 3 International Series with Carlin Motorsport	2011

•	British Formula 3 International Series with Carlin.

•	5th overall. 2 wins, 4 second places, 3 third places, 4 poles, 1 fastest lap.

•	Zandvoort F3 Masters finished 5th with 3rd fastest lap.

•	Tested GP2 for Racing Engineering in Jerez.

•	Awarded the Rising Star by the British Racing Drivers Club

•	Became brand ambassador for Volkswagen UK and Bremont

British Formula 3 International Series with Carlin Motorsport	2010

•	British Formula 3 International Series with Carlin.

•	Won in debut race weekend at Oulton Park followed by a further 3 podiums. He finished 7th overall.

Personal life
Hobbies: karting, cycling, training
Favourite driver: Ayrton Senna
Favourite circuit: Circuit de Spa-Francorchamps

Racing record

Career summary

References

External links
 
 

1990 births
Living people
Sportspeople from Ipswich
English people of Norwegian descent
English racing drivers
Formula BMW UK drivers
Formula BMW Europe drivers
British Formula Three Championship drivers
Euroformula Open Championship drivers
MRF Challenge Formula 2000 Championship drivers
Carlin racing drivers
Double R Racing drivers
24H Series drivers